Richard F. "Richie" Lary (born 1948, Brooklyn) is the RL of the PDP-8 RL Monitor System, which subsequently became MS/8. Years later, while working for Digital Equipment Corporation, he was also involved with other DEC hardware and software, including "principal architect for OS/8" and "working on the VAX architecture."

Biography
They were $2/hour summertime Fortran programmers in 1965, using an IBM 1130.

Lary left DEC in 2000, forming a company he and his wife Ellen Lary, also a former DEC employee, named TuteLary.

References

Stuyvesant High School alumni
People from Brooklyn
1948 births
Living people

Computer hardware engineers
Digital Equipment Corporation people